Phenom may refer to:

 AMD Phenom, the 64-bit AMD desktop processor line based on the K10 microarchitecture
 Phenom II, a family of AMD's multi-core 45 nm processors using the AMD K10 microarchitecture
 Phenom (electron microscope), a fast electron microscope
 Phenom (rock group), a progressive rock group from Bangalore, India
 "Phenom" (song), a song by American rapper Xzibit
 Phenom (TV series), an American sitcom
 Embraer Phenom, a line of Brazilian light jet aircraft
 The Phenom, a 2015 sports drama film starring Ethan Hawke
 The Undertaker (born 1965; aka "The Phenom"), retired American professional wrestler
 Vitor Belfort (born 1977; aka "The Phenom"), Brazilian mixed martial artist

See also 
 Phenomena (disambiguation)